A Padroeira is a Brazilian soap opera produced and broadcast by TV Globo, between 18 June 2001, and 23 February 2002.

It is written by Walcyr Carrasco in collaboration with Duca Rachid and directed by Walter Avancini, and stars Deborah Secco, Luigi Baricelli, Maurício Mattar, Mariana Ximenes, Luís Melo, Patrícia França, Paulo Goulart, Rodrigo Faro, Susana Vieira, Otávio Augusto and Elizabeth Savalla in leading roles.

Synopsis 
In the turbulent 18th century, Valentim and Cecília are two young people who fall in love but belong to different worlds and will have to fight many for their happiness.

It all begins in 1717 with the arrival in Brazil of Conde de Assumar and his small entourage, including the young Cecília de Sá. The group is attacked by a gang of robbers led by Molina, who kidnaps the girl, enchanted by her beauty. But Valentim comes to her rescue, giving birth to a love that forever changes the lives of the two. Their future is compromised: as soon as Cecília comes home and discovers that her father, Dom Lourenço de Sá, already has a suitor for her hand, the rich and powerful nobleman Dom Fernão de Avelar.

Valentim's past is also a hindrance to the union of the couple: for having refused to deliver the map of some gold mines to the Crown, Valentim's father was considered a traitor, imprisoned and killed in a cell in Lisbon. Valentim was raised by a lawyer uncle, the poet Manuel Cintra. Despite his noble and chivalrous nature, he is broken by the power of the village.

Motivated by his love for Cecília, Valentim goes to great lengths to prove his father's innocence. To do so, he will fight to find the gold mine map. Cecília, who doesn't yield easily to the will of her father, was not enchanted by Dom Fernão, who is rude, gross and arrogant. Humiliated by the rejection, Dom Fernão swears to take revenge and promises that Cecília will be his at any price.

Gold mines are also the interest to assume that the Count carried with him documents that would take them, but were stolen by Molina's gang. This articulates a plan with Blanca de Sevilla, a Spanish woman of Gypsy origin who came to Brazil fleeing the Inquisition, to infiltrate the society of Guaratinguetá and find out where is the map where Molina killed the Jesuit and steal his habit and part of the village, where he is received into the church by Padre José and Juiz Honorato Vilela, who did not distrust the deceiver. Meanwhile, Blanca gets involved with Valentim, taking advantage of his troubled romance with Cecília.

Also the fishermen of the town of Guaratinguetá have a constant struggle: the recognition of the cult of Our Lady of Aparecida, who performed miracles after his image has been found for them in the Paraiba do Sul River and want to take some powerful ambition to its logical conclusion. But the well has a powerful weapon, because when your faith gets to the heart, miracles happen in all the appearances of marriage and suffer silently with the infidelity of a strong friend and ambitious Filipe Pedroso, a cold man, who takes over the action directly, after the mysterious disappearance of his partner, the rich and admired businessman Dom Agostinho de Miranda.

Cast 
 Deborah Secco as Cecília de Sá
 Luigi Baricelli as Valentim Coimbra
 Maurício Mattar as Dom Fernão de Avelar
 Elizabeth Savalla as Imaculada de Avelar
 Patrícia França as Blanca de Sevilla 
 Luís Melo as Molina  
 Susana Vieira as Dorothéia Lopes Cintra "Dodô"
 Otávio Augusto as Manuel Cintra "Mr. Poet"
 Paulo Goulart as Dom Lourenço de Sá
 Mariana Ximenes as Izabel de Avelar 
 Rodrigo Faro as Faustino Pereira
 Murilo Rosa as Diogo Soares Cabral
 Bianca Byington as Gertudes de Sá
 Cecil Thiré as Captain Antunes
 Lu Grimaldi as Joaquina Cabral Mendonça
 Taumaturgo Ferreira as Judge Honorato Vilela
 Laura Cardoso as Silvana da Rocha
 Gustavo Haddad as Luís Antunes
 Daniel de Oliveira as Priest Gregório 
 Karina Barum as Tiburcina
 Andréa Avancini as Delfina
 Fábio Villa Verde as Brás de Sá "O Alferes"
 Cláudio Gabriel as João Alves
 Cecília Dassi as Zoé
 Renata Nascimento as Marcelina de Sá
 Luiz Antônio do Nascimento as Damião
 Samuel Mello as Cosme
 Mariah da Penha as Eusébia
 Roberto Bomtempo as Aguilar
 Iléa Ferraz as Pureza
 Cida Moreno as Rosário
 Jandir Ferrari as Inocêncio
 Lidi Lisboa as Brásia
 Dani Ornellas as Benta da Silva
 Flávio Ozório as Jacinto
 Fernando Almeida as Gil
 Emanuelle Soncini as Tonha "Antônia"
 Pablo Sobral as Cirilo
 Luciano Vianna as Tabaco
 Renata Peret as Bartira

First phase 
 Yoná Magalhães as Úrsula
 Othon Bastos as Priest José  
 Stênio Garcia as Dom Antônio Cabral
 Norton Nascimento as Zacarias
 Isaac Bardavid as Filipe Pedroso
 Jackson Antunes as Atanásio Pedroso
 António Marques as Count of Assumar
 Ida Gomes as Zuleica
 Roney Villela as João Fogaça
 Denise Milfont as Mariquinhas
 Maria Ribeiro as Rosa Maria
 Raquel Nunes as Celeste
 Carlos Gregório as Domingos Martins Correia
 Rafael Rodrigo as Miguel
 Alexandre Drummond as Tiago

Guest stars 
 Felipe Camargo as Frei Tomé
 Giulia Gam as Antonieta Miranda
 Isabel Fillardis as Clarice dos Anjos
 Cláudio Corrêa e Castro as Dom Agostinho Miranda
 Tássia Camargo as Generosa
 Stepan Nercessian as João da Cruz
 Natália Lage as Ana
 Ana Paula Tabalipa as Agnes

References

External links

2001 Brazilian television series debuts
2002 Brazilian television series endings
2001 telenovelas
TV Globo telenovelas
Brazilian telenovelas
Telenovelas by Walcyr Carrasco
Portuguese-language telenovelas
Catholicism in fiction